The Night of Decision is a 1920 German silent drama film directed by Franz Osten and starring Erich Kaiser-Titz, Henri Peters-Arnolds and Grete Reinwald.

The film's sets were designed by the art director Karl Machus.

Cast
Erich Kaiser-Titz as Minister of finance Count Menari
Henri Peters-Arnolds as Count Barella
Grete Reinwald as Angelina
Emil Mamelok as Prince
Carl Sick as Minister for Home Affairs Marquis Diaconi

References

External links

Films of the Weimar Republic
German silent feature films
Films directed by Franz Osten
German black-and-white films
1920s German films